Collins Avenue, partly co-signed State Road A1A, is a major thoroughfare in South Florida, United States. The road runs parallel to the Atlantic Ocean in Miami Beach, Florida, one block west. It also runs through the cities of Surfside and Sunny Isles Beach to the north. Collins Avenue was named for John S. Collins, a developer who, in 1913, completed Miami’s first bridge, Collins Bridge, connecting Miami Beach to the mainland across Biscayne Bay.

Background

Collins Avenue is home to many historic Art Deco hotels, and several nightclubs to the north.

North of 41st Street this boulevard lies between the Atlantic Ocean and the Indian Creek, lined by palm trees, and famous hotels from the 1950s and 1960s such as the Eden Roc and the Morris Lapidus-designed Fontainebleau Hotel, built in the curvy, flamboyant Neo-baroque fashion that defined the 1950s "Miami Beach" resort hotel style.

Significant events 

The annual Miami International Boat Show occurs on Collins Avenue. On February 2, 1973, a mentally ill man firebombed a cafeteria at 1921 Collins Avenue in Miami Beach, killing three people and injuring over 130. On June 24, 2021, an apartment building at 8777 Collins Avenue in Surfside partially collapsed, resulting in 98 fatalities.

References

Further reading 
 Kleinberg, Howard, Woggles and cheese holes : the story of Miami Beach hotels,  Miami Beach, FL : Greater Miami & The Beaches Hotel Association, 2005. 
 Kleinberg, Howard, Miami Beach : a history, Miami, FL : Centennial Press, 1994.
 Lejeune, Jean-François, et al., The making of Miami Beach, 1933-1942: the architecture of Lawrence Murray Dixon, Miami : Bass Museum of Art, 2000

Roads in Miami Beach, Florida
Roads in Miami-Dade County, Florida
Shopping districts and streets in the United States
Tourist attractions in Miami-Dade County, Florida